Montague is an unincorporated community in Pender County, North Carolina, United States. It is located east of Currie and southeast of Yamacraw.

Unincorporated communities in Pender County, North Carolina
Unincorporated communities in North Carolina